The women's 3000 metres event at the 2019 European Athletics Indoor Championships was held on 1 March 2019 at 21:40 (final) local time.

Konstanze Klosterhalfen came into the race with the leading time of the year, but the eyes were on defending champion Laura Muir.  Eilish McColgan held the point, trying to set an honest pace for the first 7 laps, with Muir running relaxed marking her position in second.  Behind them, the German duo of Klosterhalfen and Alina Reh were jockeying to maintain position near the front.  With 8 laps to go, Klosterhalfen tried to break it open, running the next 400 meters in 64 seconds.  Muir stuck to her back, not giving up even two metres, behind them the field strung out, a long gap back to Reh and Melissa Courtney trying to bridge the gap.  Even Klosterhalfen couldn't keep up the 32 second laps, but she strained to keep closer to 33 second, noticeably tiring in the process.  Muir bided her time, finally positioning herself on Klosterhalfen's shoulder before the bell, then accelerating.  Klosterhalfen had no answer and Muir stretched her lead, lapping most of the field as she finished her final lap.  Losing ground the last few laps, Courtney allowed Reh to catch her before the final lap, but then again separated to take the bronze.

Medalists

Records

Results

References

2019 European Athletics Indoor Championships
3000 metres at the European Athletics Indoor Championships